Sigma Omega Psi (ΣΩΨ) was a historically Jewish Fraternity founded in 1914 and which merged into Alpha Epsilon Pi (ΑΕΠ) in 1940.

History

Sigma Omega Psi was founded in 1914 at College of the City of New York. Its purpose was as Greek letter college fraternity for Jewish students and to foster the spirit of true brotherly love and self sacrifice. Its publication was The Shield.

The fraternity held its Sixteenth Annual Convention at the Park Central Hotel in  New York City on December 29 through 31, 1936. Its Seventeenth Annual Convention was held in Boston, Massachusetts on December 29 through 31, 1937.

By 1940, only five chapters would be active, and the decision was made to merge into Alpha Epsilon Pi.

At the time of the Union, only the chapters at Worcester Poly, Boston University, Tufts, Lowell, and New York University were active. The first three became Epsilon Deuteron chapter, Zeta Deuteron chapter, and Eta Deuteron chapter of Alpha Epsilon Pi, respectively. The chapter at Lowell could not be merged due to National Interfraternity Council requirements and the chapter at New York University was merged with Alpha Epsilon Pi's Alpha chapter. Subsequently, the chapters at Syracuse, MIT and CCNY were reactivated by Alpha Epsilon Pi and considered to be revivals of the chapters of Sigma Omega Psi at those schools.

Chapters

More than twenty chapters were founded by 1940 including:

Alumni Clubs 
Sigma Omega Psi had three alumni clubs

Notable alumni

 Nathaniel L. Goldstein - New York Attorney General 1943-1954.

References

Alpha Epsilon Pi
Student organizations established in 1914
1914 establishments in New York (state)
Historically Jewish fraternities in the United States
Jewish organizations established in 1914